William Mauricio Beltrán Cely (b. 1973 - ) – Colombian sociologist, professor from the Universidad Nacional de Colombia; the area of interest is a religious pluralization in Colombia and growth of protestantism.

Works 
 Fragmentación y recomposición del campo religioso en Bogotá: un acercamiento a la descripción del pluralismo religioso en la ciudad, Universidad Nacional de Colombia, 2004, 
 De microempresas religiosas a multinacionales de la fe: la diversificación del cristianismo en Bogotá 2006 
 Pentecostales y neopentecostales: lógicas de mercado y consumo cultural, Universidad Nacional de Colombia, 2007 
 El Pentecostalismo en Colombia. Prácticas Religiosas, Liderazgo y Participación Política Colombia 2010. Editorial Universidad Nacional De Colombia 
 
 Del monopolio católico a la explosión pentecostal: pluralización religiosa, secularización y cambio social en Colombia 2013,

References 

Colombian sociologists
1973 births
Living people